The Main Avenue (Harold H. Burton Memorial) Bridge (alternately Main Avenue Viaduct) is a cantilever truss bridge in Cleveland, Ohio carrying Ohio State Route 2/Cleveland Memorial Shoreway over the Cuyahoga River. It was named for Harold H. Burton, 45th mayor of Cleveland, in late January 1986. The bridge replaced an 1869 bridge at the same site, and was built in conjunction with construction of the Cleveland Memorial Shoreway.

The bridge received extensive renovations 1991–1992; it subsequently received major structural repairs in 2007 and again in 2012–2013, both instances necessitating re-routing of large vehicles.

The bridge is visible at the end of the "Cleveland Rocks" version of the opening credits of The Drew Carey Show.

In 2013, the Federal Highway Administration listed the Main Avenue Bridge as "structurally deficient" and "fracture critical".

The bridge has been designated as a National Historic Civil Engineering Landmark by the American Society of Civil Engineers.

See also 
List of crossings of the Cuyahoga River

References

External links

 Transcription at The Cleveland Memory Project website.

Bridges completed in 1939
Bridges in Cleveland
Road bridges in Ohio
Cantilever bridges in the United States
Bridges over the Cuyahoga River
Historic Civil Engineering Landmarks